Faubourg Saint-Germain is a historic district of Paris, France. The Faubourg has long been known as the favourite home of the French high nobility and hosts many aristocratic hôtels particuliers. It is currently part of the 7th arrondissement of Paris.

History

Early Royal History

In its early history, Faubourg Saint-Germain was an agricultural suburb of Paris, lying west of the historical Saint-Germain-des-Prés urban district.

In 1670, Louis XIV began to build a grandiose hospital and retirement home for aged and unwell soldiers: the Invalides. The king chose a site at the western end of the Faubourg and commissioned architect Libéral Bruant. The enlarged project was completed in 1676. Stretching 196 metres along the Seine River, the complex had 15 courtyards, the largest being the cour d'honneur ("court of honour") for military parades. Jules Hardouin Mansart assisted the aged Bruant, and the chapel was finished in 1679 to Bruant's designs after the elder architect's death. The construction of the Invalides opened a new district to urbanizing, offering large empty spaces between the new monument and the old city limit.

During the 18th century, French high nobility started to move from the central Marais, the then-aristocratic district of Paris where nobles used to build their urban mansions (see Hotel de Soubise) to the clearer, less populated and less polluted Faubourg Saint-Germain that soon became the new residence of French highest nobility. The district became so fashionable within the French aristocracy that the phrase le Faubourg has been used to describe French nobility ever since. The oldest and most prestigious families of the French nobility built residences in the area, such as the Hôtel Matignon, the Hôtel de Salm or the Hôtel Biron.

The French Revolution

Riots that occurred on September 14, 1788, instigated by the retirement of the publicly-hated, royalist minister Guillaume-Chrétien de Lamoignon de Malesherbes, resulted in troops being called into Faubourg Saint-Germain, and, according to Peter Kropotkin, "in the Rue Mélée and the Rue de Grenelle there was a horrible slaughter of poor folk who could not defend themselves."

During the French Revolution, many of these mansions, offering large reception rooms and exquisite decoration, were confiscated and turned into national institutions. The French expression "les ors de la Republique" (literally, "the golds of the Republic"), referring to the luxurious environment of the national palaces (official residences and institutions), comes from that time.

The Restorations

During the restoration of the Bourbon dynasty, the Faubourg recovered its past glory as the most exclusive high nobility district of Paris. Moreover, as home to the Ultra-royalist Party, it was the political center of the country.

However, after the fall of Charles X in 1830 during the July Revolution, the district lost most of its political influence. During the July Monarchy, from 1830 to 1848, when the junior Orleanist branch held the throne, the Faubourg was politically marginalized, many noble families withdrawing from active participation in political life to their châteaux, urban mansions in the Faubourg and a passive but brilliant social life. Thereafter, the Faubourg remained the center of French upper class social life. Nowadays, the Faubourg – as with the rest of the 7th arrondissement – is still one of the most exclusive districts of Paris.

Geography
The Faubourg Saint-Germain is the eastern part of the current 7th arrondissement, roughly the area between the Invalides, the 15th arrondissement and the 6th arrondissement's border. The neighborhood is more precisely bounded by the Seine River on the north, the Esplanade des Invalides/Boulevard des Invalides on the west, Rue de Babylone on the south, and the Boulevard Raspail and Boulevard Saint-Germain on the east.

Gallery

See also
Île Saint-Louis
Saint-Germain-des-Prés

References

Districts of Paris
7th arrondissement of Paris